Hamza Kastrioti was a 15th-century Albanian nobleman and the nephew of George Kastrioti Skanderbeg. Probably born in Ottoman territory, after the death of his father Stanisha he was raised by Skanderbeg, who took him in his military expeditions. After the Battle of Nish he deserted Ottoman troops together with his uncle Skanderbeg, converted to Christianity and changed his name to Bernardo (or Branilo, according to Serbian historiography). He supported Skanderbeg's uprising and was the vice captain of Skanderbeg's troops when they captured Krujë in 1443.

In 1448, Skanderbeg's forces under the command of Hamza Kastrioti and Marin Spani occupied the abandoned fortress town of Balec and reconstructed it while Skanderbeg began his war against Venice. Hamza Kastrioti did not wish to stay in the fortress and went to Drivast leaving Marin Span with 2,000 soldiers in Balec. Marin found the newly reconstructed fortress insecure and retreated with his soldiers toward Dagnum as soon as he was informed by his relative Pjetër Spani about the large Venetian forces heading toward Balec. Venetian forces recaptured Balec, burned wooden parts of the construction and destroyed reconstructed walls of the fortress.

After the marriage of Skanderbeg and the birth of his son Gjon, Hamza Kastrioti lost every hope of inheriting the Principality of Kastrioti. He deserted to the Turkish Sultan Mehmed II in 1457 and converted back to Islam and along with Isak-Beg he was one of the commanders of the Ottoman troops in the Battle of Ujëbardha. In that battle he was captured by Skanderbeg's forces and placed in detention in Naples on charges of treason. He was later freed and went to join his wife and children in Constantinople, and continued to serve in the Ottoman high ranks. His loss was regarded as a tragedy by Albanians. He was one of the most brilliant generals of Skanderbeg and was very popular among the soldiers for his manners, second only to Skanderbeg. According to historians, along with him, League of Lezhë lost the chance to continue what Skanderbeg had begun.

See also

References

15th-century Albanian people
1460s deaths
Albanians from the Ottoman Empire
Hamza
Military personnel of the Ottoman Empire
Year of birth unknown
Year of death unknown